Masaomi (written: 正臣 or 将臣) is a masculine Japanese given name. Notable people with the name include:

, Japanese manga artist
, Japanese general

Japanese masculine given names